Jeżowa  is a village in the administrative district of Gmina Ciasna, within Lubliniec County, Silesian Voivodeship, in southern Poland.

The village has a population of 550.

The name of the village is of Polish origin and comes from the word jeż, which means "hedgehog".

References

Villages in Lubliniec County